Nama Nageswara Rao (born 15 March 1957 in Balapala, Mahabubabad, Telangana) is an Indian politician, and a member of the 15th Lok Sabha of India.

Before becoming a member of the Lok Sabha, Nageswara Rao ran the infrastructure company Madhucon Projects. When he was a candidate for the Lok Sabha in 2009, he had total assets worth over Rp  ($, £), making him the wealthiest candidate.

Nageswara Rao had stood for election in 2004 for the Khammam constituency, but lost to the incumbent Renuka Chowdary by over 100,000 votes.

In May 2009, Nageswara Rao was elected to the Lok Sabha to represent the Khammam constituency, with a majority of 124,949 votes from Khammam constituency defeating Union Minister Renuka Chowdhary.

Nageswara Rao was unanimously elected Telugu Desam Parliamentary Party leader at a meeting held in the presence of the party president N. Chandrababu Naidu in May 2009.

Nageswara Rao is married to Nama Chinnamma, and has two sons and a daughter.

Political statistics

WON
With the victory in 2019 general polls, Nama Nageswar Rao (62) will be representing the Khammam Lok Sabha constituency for the second time in Parliament

References

1957 births
Living people
Businesspeople from Telangana
India MPs 2009–2014
India MPs 2019–present
Telangana Rashtra Samithi politicians
Telugu Desam Party politicians
Lok Sabha members from Telangana
People from Khammam
Telangana politicians